In mathematics, a Young symmetrizer is an element of the  group algebra of the symmetric group, constructed in such a way that, for the homomorphism from the group algebra to the endomorphisms of a vector space  obtained from the action of  on  by permutation of indices, the image of the endomorphism determined by that element corresponds to an irreducible representation of the symmetric group over the complex numbers. A similar construction works over any field, and the resulting representations are called Specht modules. The Young symmetrizer is named after British mathematician Alfred Young.

Definition

and

Corresponding to these two subgroups, define two vectors in the group algebra  as

and

The product

is the Young symmetrizer corresponding to the Young tableau λ. Each Young symmetrizer corresponds to an irreducible representation of the symmetric group, and every irreducible representation can be obtained from a corresponding Young symmetrizer. (If we replace the complex numbers by more general fields the corresponding representations will not be irreducible in general.)

Construction
Let V be any vector space over the complex numbers. Consider then the tensor product vector space  (n times). Let Sn act on this tensor product space by permuting the indices.

Then the corresponding  is given by

For any product vector  of  we then have

Thus the span of all  clearly spans  and since the  span   we obtain , where we wrote informally .

We have that

maps into , more precisely

is the projector onto .
Then

which is the projector onto .

where μ is the conjugate partition to λ.

We write

for the irreducible representation.

In particular, this implies that representations of the symmetric group can be defined over the rational numbers; that is, over the rational group algebra .

Consider, for example, S3 and the partition (2,1). Then one has

See also
 Representation theory of the symmetric group

Notes

References
 William Fulton. Young Tableaux, with Applications to Representation Theory and Geometry. Cambridge University Press, 1997. 
 Lecture 4 of 
 Bruce E. Sagan. The Symmetric Group. Springer, 2001.

Representation theory of finite groups
Symmetric functions
Permutations